Annie Lee may refer to:

 Annie Lee (actress) (born 1977), American actress
 Annie Lee (Idaho City), Cantonese woman enslaved in the 1870s
 Annie Lee (artist) (1935–2014), American artist

See also
Annie Le, a student murdered at Yale University
Anne Lee (disambiguation)
Anna Lee (disambiguation)